The Khamsa ('Quintet' or 'Quinary', from Arabic) or Panj Ganj ('Five Treasures') is the main and best known work of Nizami Ganjavi.

Description

The Khamsa is in five long narrative poems:
 Makhzan-ol-Asrâr ('The Treasury or Storehouse of Mysteries'), 1163 (some date it 1176)
 Khosrow o Shirin ('Khosrow and Shirin'), 1177–1180
 Leyli o Majnun ('Layla and Majnun'), 1192
 Eskandar-Nâmeh ('The Book of Alexander'), 1194 or 1196–1202
 Haft Peykar ('The Seven Beauties'), 1197

The first of these poems, Makhzan-ol-Asrâr, was influenced by Sanai's (d. 1131) monumental Garden of Truth. The four other poems are medieval romances. Khosrow and Shirin, Bahram-e Gur, and Alexander the Great, who all have episodes devoted to them in Ferdowsi's Shahnameh, appear again here at the center of three of four of Nezami's narrative poems. The adventure of the paired lovers, Layla and Majnun, is the subject of the second of his four romances, and derived from Arabic sources. In all these cases, Nezami reworked the material from his sources in a substantial way.

The Khamsa was a popular subject for lavish manuscripts illustrated with painted miniatures at the Persian and Mughal courts in later centuries. Examples include the Khamsa of Nizami (British Library, Or. 12208), created for the Mughal Emperor Akbar in the 1590s. A Khamsa manuscript created for Prince Aurangzeb, the sixth Mughal emperor, is now in the Khalili Collection of Islamic Art. Its illustrations of Bahram Gur depict the character as Aurangzeb.

Gallery

See also
 Khamsa of Nizami (British Library, Or. 12208)

References

Nizami Ganjavi
Medieval Persian literature
Persian poetry
Memory of the World Register in Iran